Muhammad Idham Amin Ramlan (born 13 December 2000) is a Malaysian international lawn bowler and South East Asian champion. He has represented Malaysia at the Commonwealth Games.

Biography
In 2018 he won the U-25 gold medal at the 2018 Asian Lawn Championships. In 2021, he won the gold medal at the Lawn bowls at the Southeast Asian Games in the fours event.

In 2022, he was selected for the 2022 Commonwealth Games in Birmingham, where he competed in the men's pairs event and the men's fours event.

References

2000 births
Living people
Malaysian male bowls players
Bowls players at the 2022 Commonwealth Games
Commonwealth Games competitors for Malaysia
Southeast Asian Games gold medalists for Malaysia
Southeast Asian Games medalists in lawn bowls
Competitors at the 2019 Southeast Asian Games